Konstantin Petrovich Lepyokhin (born 2 October 1975) is a Russian professional football coach and a former player. He works as an administrator with FC Druzhba Maykop.

Club career
He made his professional debut in the Russian First Division in 1993 for FC Druzhba Maykop.

He played for the main squad of FC Kuban Krasnodar in the Russian Cup.

Honours
 Russian Premier League bronze: 2001.
 Russian Cup winner: 1999.
 Russian Cup finalist: 2002.

European club competitions
With FC Zenit St. Petersburg.

 UEFA Cup 1999–2000: 1 game.
 UEFA Intertoto Cup 2000: 3 games.
 UEFA Cup 2002–03: 2 games.

References

1975 births
People from Voronezh Oblast
Living people
Russian footballers
Association football defenders
Russia youth international footballers
Russia under-21 international footballers
Russian Premier League players
FC Zenit Saint Petersburg players
FC Kuban Krasnodar players
Russian football managers
FC Dynamo Saint Petersburg players
FC Zenit-2 Saint Petersburg players
Sportspeople from Voronezh Oblast